Velestino is a town in the Magnesia regional unit, Thessaly, Greece. It is the seat of the municipality Rigas Feraios.

Location
It is situated at  elevation on a hillside, at the southeastern end of the Thessalian Plain. Velestino has a train station on the local line from Larissa to Volos. The Motorway 1 (Athens - Larissa - Thessaloniki) passes east of the town. The Greek writer and revolutionary Rigas Feraios was born in Velestino in 1757.

History

Velestino is built on the site of ancient Pherae. The ancient settlement is still attested in early Byzantine times, but was apparently abandoned following the Slavic invasions of the 7th century.

The current settlement appears with its current name—probably of Slavic origin—for the first time in 1208, in a letter by Pope Innocent III mentioning its Frankish ruler, Berthold of Katzenelnbogen. In  it was part of the jurisdiction of the Latin bishop of Gardiki, Bartholomew (Cardicensis episcopus et Valestinensis). At about the same time, it became a Greek Orthodox episcopal see as well, being attested thereafter in episcopal lists and acts of the Patriarchate of Constantinople. In 1259 an imperial estate (kouratoria) is attested in the area, as part of the province (thema) of Halmyros; by the 1280s, Velestino itself is listed as a separate thema. Very few traces remain of the medieval town today.

Under the Ottoman Empire, Velestino was called Velestin and was the seat of a kaza within the Sanjak of Tirhala.

With the rest of Thessaly, Velestino was ceded to Greece in 1881 by the Convention of Constantinople.

The Battle of Velestino was fought here during the Greco-Turkish War of 1897.

Velestino is a village partly populated by people of Aromanian heritage. Reportedly, as of 1911, Velestino was predominantly Aromanian.

References 

Populated places in Magnesia (regional unit)
Aromanian settlements in Greece
Defunct dioceses of the Ecumenical Patriarchate of Constantinople
Populated places of the Byzantine Empire